Corinna Union Academy was a historic school in Corinna, Maine that is now a museum.

Corinna Union Academy was founded in 1851 when seventy citizens founded an organization and constructed the high school academy building.  In 1852 the Maine legislature provided the school with a charter. The building was expanded in 1931. Corinna Union Academy closed in 1968 as a high school and local students began attending Nokomis Regional High, SAD 48, but the building was still used as Corinna Junior High until it closed in 1998.

Notable alumni
Gilbert Patten, author of dime novels
Grenville C. Emery, founder of Harvard-Westlake School

References

External links
 Town of Corinna: Corinna Historical Society Museum

Schools in Maine
Museums in Penobscot County, Maine
History museums in Maine